Rethymno is one of the four regional units of Crete, Greece. Its capital is the city of Rethymno. Today its main income is tourism. The countryside is also based economically on agriculture and herding.

Administration

The regional unit Rethymno is subdivided into 5 municipalities. These are (number as in the map in the infobox):

Agios Vasileios (2)
Amari (3)
Anogeia (4)
Mylopotamos (5)
Rethymno (1)

Prefecture

The Rethymno prefecture was created while Crete was still an autonomous state, and was preserved after the island joined Greece in 1913. As a part of the 2011 Kallikratis government reform, the Rethymno regional unit was created out of the former prefecture. The prefecture had the same territory as the present regional unit. At the same time, the municipalities were reorganised, according to the table below.

Provinces

 Rethymno Province - Rethymno
 Agios Vasileios Province - Spili
 Amari Province - Amari
 Mylopotamos Province - Perama
Note: Provinces no longer hold any legal status in Greece.

Main towns

The main towns of the regional unit Rethymno are (ranked by 2011 census population):
Rethymno 34,300
Atsipopoulo 4,947
Anogeia 2,379

Notable people

Kostas Moundakis
Nikos Xilouris
Thanassis Skordalos
Nick the Greek

See also
List of settlements in the Rethymno regional unit

References

 
Prefectures of Greece
Regional units of Crete